is a Kofun period burial mound located in the Musa neighborhood of Kita-ku, Okayama,  Okayama Prefecture, in the San'yō region of Japan. The tumulus was designated a National Historic Site of Japan in 1930.

Overview
The Musa Ōtsuka Kofun is an -style circular tumulus with a diameter of 40 meters and a height of 10 meters, and a huge tunnel-style stone burial chamber with a total length of 18 meters with the opening orientated to the east. It is situated at a strategic location where the ancient route of the San'yōdō highway crosses the Asahi River. The burial chamber is made of megalithic blocks of granite and contains a hollowed-out house-shaped sarcophagus measuring 2.88 meters long, 1.6 meters wide, and 1.5 meters high. The sarcophagus is made of shell limestone quarried at Mount Namigata in Ibara, Okayama. The sarcophagus has a hole, from which its grave goods were robbed in antiquity. It is estimated that the tumulus was built at the end of the 6th century from the shape of the sarcophagus, and its is speculated that this was a mausoleum of the Kibi no Kamimichi clan, a powerful ruling family in ancient Kingdom of Kibi.

See also
List of Historic Sites of Japan (Okayama)

References

External links

 Okayama City home page
Prefecture home page

History of Okayama Prefecture
Okayama
Historic Sites of Japan
Archaeological sites in Japan
Kofun